Maria Lackovics (born 24 March 1950) is a former Romanian handball player who competed in the 1976 Summer Olympics.

She was part of the Romanian handball team, which finished fourth in the Olympic tournament. She played three matches and scored three goals.

References

1950 births
Living people
Romanian female handball players 
Olympic handball players of Romania

Handball players at the 1976 Summer Olympics